Torfi Olafsson (born 13 April 1965) is an Icelandic former strongman competitor and junior world champion powerlifter. He was one of the biggest competitors from Iceland to compete at the World's Strongest Man, standing 201 cm (6'7") and weighing 190 kg (418 lbs).

Biography
Torfi was born on 13 April 1965. His father was in the road construction industry and Torfi began working for him as early as seven years old. He spent his summers helping his father until he was seventeen. He became the Icelandic powerlifting champion and at the age of 20 won the IPF Junior World Powerlifting Championship. He repeated this feat the following year. As a senior, he placed ninth a number of years later. He also won the EPF Junior European crown.

Like a number of his compatriots he turned to strength athletics and on the strongman circuit was very successful. He won Iceland's Strongest Man in 1997 and was placed third in the prestigious World Muscle Power Championships in 1996. Of the five World's Strongest Man contests he entered, his highest place was fourth in 1997. He was also a keen Highland Games competitor.

Outside of sport Torfi worked in Iceland with the mentally handicapped and is married with four children and a dog. And 5 grandchildren His daughter Kristin Helga Torfadottir is a powerlifter of growing reputation. His son Stefán Karel Torfason became Iceland's Strongest Man in 2021.

References

1965 births
Living people
Icelandic strength athletes
Icelandic powerlifters